Dylan Carlson may refer to:
Dylan Carlson (musician), American musician, frontman of the band Earth
Dylan Carlson (baseball), American baseball outfielder for the St. Louis Cardinals